Lord Sutherland may refer to:

 Hugh de Moravia (died c. 1219), first Lord de Sudrland (Sutherland)
 Ranald Sutherland, Lord Sutherland (born 1932), former Scottish judge
 Stewart Sutherland, Baron Sutherland of Houndwood (1941–2018), Scottish philosopher
 Lord Ronald Charles Sutherland-Leveson-Gower (1845–1916), Scottish Liberal MP
 William de Moravia, 1st Earl of Sutherland (c. 1210–1248), Scottish clan chief